Até que a Sorte nos Separe ( Till Luck Do Us Part) is a 2012 Brazilian comedy film directed by Roberto Santucci and starring Leandro Hassum and Danielle Winits. The film is inspired by the best selling book Casais Inteligentes Enriquecem Juntos by Gustavo Cerbasi. Its sequel, Até que a Sorte nos Separe 2, was released in Brazilian theaters on 27 December 2013. The film received generally negative reviews, with critics criticising the acting, the lack of originality and forced humor.

Plot
Tino (Leandro Hassum) is a common family man who sees his life change dramatically after winning the lottery. Leading a life of ostentatious with his wife, Jane (Danielle Winits), he spends all the money in 15 years. When broken, Tino accepts the help of neighbor Amauri (Kiko Mascarenhas), a bureaucratic and finance consultant who lives his own drama when facing a crisis in marriage with Laura (Rita Elmôr). Trying to avoid that Jane discover the new financial situation, after all she is pregnant and cannot go through strong emotions, Tino engages in various confusions to pretend that everything is well. For that, he relies on help of his best friend, Adelson (Aílton Graça), and his children's.

Cast

Leandro Hassum as Tino
Danielle Winits as Jane
Julia Dalavia as Tete
Kiko Mascarenhas as Amauri
Rita Elmôr as Laura
Ailton Graça as Adelson
Rodrigo Sant'anna as Vander
Maurício Sherman as Olavo
Henry Fiuka as Juninho
Victor Mayer as Bruno
Marcelo Saback as Nelsinho
Carlos Bonow as Rickson

References

External links

Brazilian comedy films
Films shot in Rio de Janeiro (city)
2012 comedy films
2012 films
2010s Portuguese-language films